The Oakland Athletics' 1981 season saw the A's finish with an overall record of 64 wins and 45 losses. They finished the season with the best record in the American League (and second best in all of baseball). Due to the infamous 1981 players strike, the league resorted to a split-season format; this new format saw the winners of both halves of the season playing in the first divisional playoff in MLB history. The A's qualified by posting the AL West's best record in the first half of the season. While they swept the Kansas City Royals in the AL West playoff, they were themselves swept by the New York Yankees in the 1981 American League Championship Series.

The Athletics' 1981 season ranks among the organization's most interesting. The A's, only two years removed from a disastrous 54-108 finish, won their first AL West crown since 1975 under second-year manager Billy Martin. The "Billyball" A's began the season with a then-AL record 11 consecutive wins (this record was later broken by the 1987 Milwaukee Brewers, who raced out to a 13-0 start). The squad followed its first loss of the season, a tough 3-2 loss to the Seattle Mariners, with six more victories. Their 17-1 start (through 18 games) remains unmatched. The A's starting rotation (consisting of Rick Langford, Matt Keough, Steve McCatty, Mike Norris, and Brian Kingman) received national attention during the torrid start; the unit was collectively featured on the cover of Sports Illustrated's April 27, 1981, edition. The periodic heroics of Tony Armas and Rickey Henderson also drew notice.

The Athletics, however, slumped badly following the 17-1 start. While they regained some of their swagger during the season's second half, they ultimately played .500 baseball for the rest of the season. Even still, the A's won the AL West's first half with a 37-23 mark; they also led the division in total wins despite losing the second half to the Royals. The A's swept these 50-53 Royals in the ALDS. The A's themselves were humbled in the ALCS, as the Yankees outscored Oakland 20-4 in a humiliating three-game rout. The 1981 ALCS is perhaps best remembered as the purported birthplace of "the wave"; while the phenomenon's origin is disputed, it is most commonly attributed to Krazy George Henderson, who introduced it to the Athletics' crowd during the series' final game.

Despite high expectations, the A's collapsed in 1982. A rash of injuries, among other factors, saw the team plummet to an abysmal 68-94 record. The firing of Billy Martin at seasons' end brought a swift and unceremonious end to the "Billyball" era. All told, the A's would have to wait until 1988 for their next postseason appearance. Only one member of the 1981 team (Rich Bordi) also played on the 1988 team.

Offseason 
 October 23, 1980: Randy Elliott was released by the Athletics.
 December 8, 1980: Brian Doyle was drafted by the Athletics from the New York Yankees in the 1980 rule 5 draft.
 December 9, 1980: DeWayne Buice was drafted by the Oakland Athletics from the San Francisco Giants in the 1980 minor league draft.
 December 11, 1980: Michael King (minors) was traded by the Athletics to the Chicago Cubs for Cliff Johnson and Keith Drumright.
 January 13, 1981: Steve Kiefer was drafted by the Athletics in the 1st round of the 1981 Major League Baseball draft.
 February 10, 1981: The Athletics traded a player to be named later to the Houston Astros for Jimmy Sexton. The Athletics completed the trade by sending Rick Lysander to the Astros on October 20.
 March 27, 1981: Bob Lacey and Roy Moretti (minors) were traded by the Athletics to the San Diego Padres for Kevin Bell, Tony Phillips and Eric Mustad (minors).
 March 30, 1981: Alan Wirth was released by the Athletics.

Ownership 
Athletics owner Charlie O. Finley's wife sought a divorce and would not accept part of a baseball team in a property settlement.  With most of his money tied up in the A's or his insurance empire, Finley had to sell the team. Though Finley found a buyer in businessman Marvin Davis, who would have moved the Athletics to Denver, the tentative deal hit a snag when the Raiders announced their move to Los Angeles. Oakland and Alameda County officials, not wanting to be held responsible for losing Oakland's status as a big-league city in its own right, refused to let Finley break the lease with the Coliseum. Finley then looked to local buyers, selling the A's to San Francisco clothing manufacturer Walter A. Haas, Jr., president of Levi Strauss & Co. prior to the 1981 season.

Haas restored the official name of the club to "Athletics" in 1981, but retained the nickname "A's" for marketing purposes. At first, the word "Athletics" was restored only to the club's logo, underneath the much larger stylized-"A" that had come to represent the team since the early days. Former owner Charlie Finley banned the word "Athletics" from the club's name because he felt that name was too closely associated with former Philadelphia Athletics owner Connie Mack.

During the Finley era, average home attendance from 1968–1980 was 777,000 per season, with 1,075,518 in 1975 being the highest attendance for a Finley-owned team. In marked contrast, during the first year of Haas' ownership, the Athletics drew 1,304,052—in a season shortened by a player strike. Were it not for the strike, the A's were on a pace to draw over 2.2 million in 1981. The A's finished with the second-best overall record in baseball, and the best record in the American League.

Spring training

The Oakland Athletics held spring training at Rendezvous Park in Mesa, Arizona.

Regular season 
 April 19, 1981: In the first game of a doubleheader with the Seattle Mariners, the A's won 6-1 to win their then-record 11th consecutive game to start a season.
 April 25, 1981: Prior to a game against the Seattle Mariners, Seattle manager Maury Wills advised the Kingdome groundskeepers to enlarge the batter's box by a foot. A's manager Billy Martin noticed. Martin showed umpire Bill Kunkel that the batter's box was seven feet long instead of six feet. Martin felt that batters being able to move up a foot in the box could cut at pitches before a curveball broke. Wills was suspended for two games and fined $500.

Game log

First half

|-
| 1 || April 9 || @ Twins
|-
| 2 || April 10 || @ Twins
|-
| 3 || April 11 || @ Twins
|-
| 4 || April 12 || @ Twins
|-
| 5 || April 13 || @ Angels
|-
| 6 || April 14 || @ Angels
|-
| 7 || April 15 || @ Angels
|-
| 8 || April 16 || @ Angels
|-
| 9 || April 17 || Mariners
|-
| 10 || April 18 || Mariners
|-
| 11 || April 19 || Mariners
|-
| 12 || April 19 || Mariners
|-
| 13 || April 20 || Twins
|-
| 14 || April 21 || Twins
|-
| 15 || April 22 || Twins
|-
| 16 || April 24 || @ Mariners
|-
| 17 || April 25 || @ Mariners
|-
| 18 || April 26 || @ Mariners
|-
| 19 || April 27 || Angels
|-
| 20 || April 28 || Angels
|-
| 21 || April 29 || Angels
|-

|-
| 22 || May 1 || Yankees
|-
| 23 || May 2 || Yankees
|-
| 24 || May 3 || Yankees
|-
| 25 || May 3 || Yankees
|-
| 26 || May 5 || Tigers
|-
| 27 || May 6 || Tigers
|-
| 28 || May 7 || Tigers
|-
| 29 || May 8 || Brewers
|-
| 30 || May 9 || Brewers
|-
| 31 || May 10 || Brewers
|-
| 32 || May 12 || @ Yankees
|-
| 33 || May 13 || @ Yankees
|-
| 34 || May 14 || @ Yankees
|-
| 35 || May 15 || @ Brewers
|-
| 36 || May 16 || @ Brewers
|-
| 37 || May 17 || @ Brewers
|-
| 38 || May 18 || @ Orioles
|-
| 39 || May 19 || @ Orioles
|-
| 40 || May 20 || @ Red Sox
|-
| 41 || May 21 || @ Red Sox
|-
| 42 || May 22 || Blue Jays
|-
| 43 || May 23 || Blue Jays
|-
| 44 || May 24 || Blue Jays
|-
| 45 || May 24 || Blue Jays
|-
| 46 || May 25 || White Sox
|-
| 47 || May 26 || White Sox
|-
| 48 || May 27 || White Sox
|-
| 49 || May 29 || @ Blue Jays
|-
| 50 || May 30 || @ Blue Jays
|-
| 51 || May 31 || @ Blue Jays
|-

|-
| 52 || June 2 || @ White Sox
|-
| 53 || June 3 || @ White Sox
|-
| 54 || June 4 || @ White Sox
|-
| 55 || June 5 || Red Sox
|-
| 56 || June 6 || Red Sox
|-
| 57 || June 7 || Red Sox
|-
| 58 || June 9 || Orioles
|-
| 59 || June 9 || Orioles
|-
| 60 || June 10 || Orioles
|-

Second half

|-  style="text-align:center; background:#bbcaff;"
|align="center" colspan="10"|All-Star Break: NL def. AL at Cleveland Stadium, 5–4
|-
| 61 || August 10 || @ Twins
|-
| 62 || August 11 || @ Twins
|-
| 63 || August 12 || @ Twins
|-
| 64 || August 14 || Angels
|-
| 65 || August 15 || Angels
|-
| 66 || August 16 || Angels
|-
| 67 || August 18 || Red Sox
|-
| 68 || August 19 || Red Sox
|-
| 69 || August 20 || Red Sox
|-
| 70 || August 21 || Orioles
|-
| 71 || August 22 || Orioles
|-
| 72 || August 23 || Orioles
|-
| 73 || August 24 || Indians
|-
| 74 || August 25 || Indians
|-
| 75 || August 27 || @ Red Sox
|-
| 76 || August 28 || @ Red Sox
|-
| 77 || August 29 || @ Red Sox
|-
| 78 || August 30 || @ Red Sox
|-
| 79 || August 31 || @ Indians
|-

|-
| 80 || September 2 || @ Indians
|-
| 81 || September 2 || @ Indians
|-
| 82 || September 3 || @ Orioles
|-
| 83 || September 4 || @ Orioles
|-
| 84 || September 5 || @ Orioles
|-
| 85 || September 6 || @ Orioles
|-
| 86 || September 7 || Rangers
|-
| 87 || September 8 || Rangers
|-
| 88 || September 9 || Rangers
|-
| 89 || September 11 || Royals
|-
| 90 || September 12 || Royals
|-
| 91 || September 13 || Royals
|-
| 92 || September 14 || @ Rangers
|-
| 93 || September 15 || @ Rangers
|-
| 94 || September 16 || @ Rangers
|-
| 95 || September 18 || @ White Sox
|-
| 96 || September 19 || @ White Sox
|-
| 97 || September 20 || @ White Sox
|-
| 98 || September 22 || @ Blue Jays
|-
| 99 || September 22 || @ Blue Jays
|-
| 100 || September 23 || @ Blue Jays
|-
| 101 || September 25 || White Sox
|-
| 102 || September 26 || White Sox
|-
| 103 || September 27 || White Sox
|-
| 104 || September 27 || White Sox
|-
| 105 || September 29 || Blue Jays
|-
| 106 || September 30 || Blue Jays
|-

|-
| 107 || October 2 || @ Royals
|-
| 108 || October 3 || @ Royals
|-
| 109 || October 4 || @ Royals
|-

Season standings

Record vs. opponents

Notable transactions 
 April 6, 1981: The Athletics traded a player to be named later and cash to the Pittsburgh Pirates for Bob Owchinko. The Athletics completed the trade by sending Ernie Camacho to the Pirates on April 10.
 April 9, 1981: Dave Heaverlo was signed as a free agent by the Athletics.
 April 10, 1981: Gorman Heimueller was signed as a free agent by the Athletics.
 April 14, 1981: Chris Codiroli was signed as a free agent by the Athletics.
 April 22, 1981: Chuck Hensley was signed as a free agent with the Oakland Athletics.
 May 20, 1981: Dave Revering, Mike Patterson and Chuck Dougherty (minors) were traded by the Athletics to the New York Yankees for Jim Spencer and Tom Underwood.
 June 10, 1981: Rick Bosetti was purchased by the Athletics from the Toronto Blue Jays.
 August 27, 1981: Tim Hosley was released by the Athletics.

Draft picks 
 June 8, 1981: 1981 Major League Baseball draft
Mike Gallego was drafted by the Athletics in the 2nd round (33rd pick). Player signed June 12, 1981.
Rick Rodriguez was drafted by the Athletics in the 2nd round (41st pick).
Mickey Tettleton was drafted by the Athletics in the 5th round.

Billyball, year two 
Following the team's surprising success in 1980, manager Billy Martin was given the additional title of general manager in 1981. The team won the division title for the first time since 1975, winning the first half of the split season, then defeating the Royals in the divisional playoffs before losing to the Yankees in the ALCS.

While the team was successful, it came at a high price, both for the team and for the pitching staff. Following a season in which the team led the league in complete games with 94—an astonishing number for the time—the Athletics again led the league with 60 complete games out of 109 total games in the strike-shortened season. For the second time, the pitching staff completed more than half their total number of games and more than double the number of the team with the second-highest total (The Indians and Tigers each had 33). The workload of the pitchers over the two seasons was blamed by the team's ownership for the team's fall to fifth place in 1982, which led to Martin's firing from both positions. Many of the pitchers suffered injuries, and none of the four main starting pitchers (Rick Langford, Steve McCatty, Mike Norris, Matt Keough) ever duplicated their success of 1980–81.

Roster

Player stats

Batting

Starters by position 
Note: Pos = Position; G = Games played; AB = At bats; H = Hits; Avg. = Batting average; HR = Home runs; RBI = Runs batted in

Other batters 
Note: G = Games played; AB = At bats; H = Hits; Avg. = Batting average; HR = Home runs; RBI = Runs batted in

Pitching

Starting pitchers 
Note: G = Games played; IP = Innings pitched; W = Wins; L = Losses; ERA = Earned run average; SO = Strikeouts

Other pitchers 
Note: G = Games pitched; IP = Innings pitched; W = Wins; L = Losses; ERA = Earned run average; SO = Strikeouts

Relief pitchers 
Note: G = Games pitched; W = Wins; L = Losses; SV = Saves; ERA = Earned run average; SO = Strikeouts

Postseason

ALDS 

Oakland wins series, 3-0.

ALCS 

Yankees win the Series, 3-0

Game log

|-
| Game 1 || October 6 || @ Royals
|-
| Game 2 || October 7 || @ Royals
|-
| Game 3 || October 9 || Royals
|-

|-
| Game 1 || October 13 || @ Yankees
|-
| Game 2 || October 14 || @ Yankees
|-
| Game 3 || October 15 || Yankees
|-

Awards and honors 
 Rickey Henderson, American League leader, Hits
 Billy Martin, Associated Press AL Manager of the Year

Farm system

References

External links
1981 Oakland Athletics at Baseball Reference
1981 Oakland Athletics at Baseball Almanac

Oakland Athletics seasons
Oakland Athletics season
American League West champion seasons
Oak